is a Japanese multinational cyber security software company with global headquarters in Tokyo, Japan and Irving, Texas, United States, and global R&D headquarters in Taipei, Taiwan. Other regional headquarters and R&D centers are located around East Asia, Southeast Asia, Europe, and North America. The company develops enterprise security software for servers, containers, & cloud computing environments, networks, and end points. Its cloud and virtualization security products provide automated security for customers of VMware, Amazon AWS, Microsoft Azure, and Google Cloud Platform.

Eva Chen, who is the founder, currently serves as Trend Micro's chief executive officer, a position she has held since 2005. She succeeded founding CEO Steve Chang, who now serves as chairman.

History

1988–1999
The company was founded in 1988 in Los Angeles by Steve Chang, his wife, Jenny Chang, and her sister, Eva Chen (陳怡樺). The company was established with proceeds from Steve Chang's previous sale of a copy protection dongle to a United States-based Rainbow Technologies. Shortly after establishing the company, its founders moved headquarters to Taipei.

In 1992, Trend Micro took over a Japanese software firm to form Trend Micro Devices and established headquarters in Tokyo. It then made an agreement with CPU maker Intel, under which it produced an anti-virus product for local area networks (LANs) for sale under the Intel brand. Intel paid royalties to Trend Micro for sales of LANDesk Virus Protect in the United States and Europe, while Trend paid royalties to Intel for sales in Asia. In 1993, Novell began bundling the product with its network operating system. In 1996 the two companies agreed to a two-year continuation of the agreement in which Trend was allowed to globally market the ServerProtect product under its own brand alongside Intel's LANDesk brand.

Trend Micro was listed on the Tokyo Stock Exchange in 1998 under the ticker 4704. The company began trading on the United States-based NASDAQ stock exchange in July 1999.

2000s
In 2004, founding chief executive officer Steve Chang decided to split the responsibilities of CEO and chairman of the company. Company co-founder Eva Chen succeeded Chang as chief executive officer of Trend Micro in January 2005. Chen had most recently served as the company's chief technology officer since 1996 and before that executive vice president since the company's founding in October 1989. Chang retained his position as company chairman. In May, Trend Micro acquired US-based antispyware company InterMute for $15 million. Trend Micro had fully integrated InterMute's SpySubtract antispyware program into its antispyware product offerings by the end of that year. 

In June 2005 Trend Micro acquired Kelkea, a US-based developer of antispam software. Kelkea developed Mail Abuse Prevention System (MAPS) and IP filtering software that allowed internet service providers to block spam and phishing scams. Kelkea chief executive officer Dave Rand was retained by Trend Micro as its chief technologist for content security.

In March 2007, Trend Micro acquired freeware antispyware program HijackThis from its creator Merijn Bellekom for an undisclosed sum. Trend Micro delisted its depository shares from the NASDAQ stock exchange in May. Later that year, in October, Trend Micro acquired US-based data loss prevention software developer Provilla. Provilla was the creator LeakProof, software that allowed companies to block the transmission of sensitive data and warn security managers about transmission attempts.

Trend Micro acquired Identum in February 2008 for an undisclosed sum. Identum, which was founded in and later spun-off from the University of Bristol cryptography department, developed ID-based email encryption software. Identum's chairman was serial entrepreneur, Steve Purdham. The two companies were originally in talks for Trend Micro to license Identum's technology, but Trend Micro later decided to purchase the firm outright. Identum was renamed Trend Micro (Bristol) and its encryption technology was integrated into existing Trend Micro products. Existing Identum products were continued but sold under the Trend Micro brand. Also that year, Trend Micro sued Barracuda Networks for the latter's distribution of ClamAV as part of a security package. Trend Micro claimed that Barracuda's use of ClamAV infringed on a software patent owned by Trend Micro for filtering viruses on an Internet gateway.  On 19 May 2011, the U.S. Patent and Trademark Office issued a Final Rejection in the reexamination of Trend Micro's U.S. patent 5,623,600.

In April 2009, Trend Micro acquired Ottawa, Canada-based Third Brigade for an undisclosed sum. Third Brigade developed host-based intrusion prevention and firewall software that had been used by Trend Micro in its Trend OfficeScan anti-malware suite for two years prior to acquiring Third Brigade. Third Brigade was reincorporated as Trend Micro Canada Technologies.

2010s
Trend Micro acquired UK-based humyo in June 2010 for an undisclosed sum. humyo provided cloud-based data storage and synchronization services to small businesses and individuals. Later that year, in November, Trend Micro acquired Mobile Armor. Mobile Armor was a developer of full disk, file and folder, and removable media encryption for mobile devices. Trend Micro integrated the company's technology into a centrally-managed platform for mobile device security.

In June 2012, Trend Micro acquired US-based Secure Sockets Layer (SSL) certificate provider AffirmTrust for an undisclosed sum. Trend Micro followed up with another acquisition, Taiwanese advanced network-security firm Broadweb, in October 2012. Broadweb was a developer of deep packet inspection technology that had the ability to block malicious data packets in real-time. The technology was integrated into Trend Micro's Custom Defense Solution, a suite that was designed to provide network-wide visibility and protection against advanced attacks and threats.

Trend Micro relocated its US headquarters to the Las Colinas area of Irving, Texas in September 2013. The relocation allowed the company to consolidate operations previously housed in Cupertino, California and Arlington, Texas.

In September 2014, Trend Micro began a partnership with INTERPOL wherein Trend Micro shared with the international police organization information on cybercrime threats via the company's Threat Intelligence Service. According to INTERPOL, the information helped the international police organization and its 190 member countries decrease cybercrime on a global scale. Trend Micro also provided a cybercrime investigation training program to INTERPOL.

Also in 2014, Trend Micro expanded its Cloud App Security to protect with Microsoft Office 365 from threats not caught by native Microsoft Security. By 2016, the Cloud App Security software was expanded to cover Box, Dropbox and Google Drive.

In October 2015, Trend Micro reached an agreement to buy TippingPoint, a network and software security developer from HP Inc. for $US300 million. This included the bug bounty program, the Zero Day Initiative which was incorporated in Trend Micro Research's focus on existing threats, vulnerabilities, and future potential security issues.

That same year, Trend Micro was certified as a VCE validation ready solution and Vblock ready through the VCE Technology Alliance Partner program. Later, Trend Micro joined the VCE Select Program, which allowed Trend Micro's Deep Security to be bundled with VCE's converged and hyper-converged infrastructure systems.

Gartner named Trend Micro to the "Leaders" ranking of its Magic Quadrant rating for endpoint protection platforms in 2015, 2016 and 2017. In 2016, Trend Micro discovered that a variant of a virus affecting Android phones was able to infect smart TVs.

Trend announced the launch of a $US100 million venture capital investment fund in June 2017 focused on the next generation of technology including the Internet of Things (IoT). In September 2017, Trend Micro was awarded reimbursement through the U.S. District Court for a portion of the legal fees incurred over rejected patent claims filed by Intellectual Ventures. The company subsequently launched Trend Forward Capital. The venture's initial investments included business-to-business payment company Veem, wearable device company Muse, telemetry company Mojio and brain health technology company Interaxon.

In November 2017, Trend Micro acquired IMMUNIO, adding new capabilities for hybrid cloud security that fit neatly into the DevOps life cycle. IMMUNIO introduced early detection and protection against application vulnerabilities and container image scanning allowing for the publishing and protection of secure container images.

In December 2017, Trend partnered with Telco Systems to develop a virtual network cybersecurity platform combining Trend's Virtual Network Function Suite with Telco's NFVTime software.

In April 2018, Trend Micro joined the Cybersecurity Tech Accord, a public agreement between companies to defend all customers from malicious attacks by cybercriminal gangs and nation states.

In August 2018, researchers discovered that several Trend Micro consumer products for MacOS were capturing browser history and other data, including passwords, and sending it to a remote server for initial analysis designed to enhance security. The products identified were Dr. Cleaner, Dr. Cleaner Pro, Dr. Antivirus, Dr. Unarchiver, Dr. Battery, Duplicate Finder and Open Any File. As a consequence, Apple removed the Trend Micro products from its Mac App Store. Trend Micro admitted that the products had captured and uploaded the data. It also apologized to its "community for concern they might have felt", but went on to excuse the activity as being "humbly the result of the use of common code libraries", and that, in any event, appropriation of users' data was "explicitly disclosed in the applicable EULAs".

In September 2018 Trend Micro and HITRUST announced a partnership to launch a new center which provides advanced cyber risk management. In November 2018 Trend Micro and Moxa Inc., announced the formation of a joint-venture corporation, TXOne Networks, which will focus on the security needs present in the Industrial Internet of Things (IoT) environments.

Technologies
In June 2008, Trend Micro introduced Trend Micro Smart Protection Network, a cloud-client content security infrastructure that delivers global threat intelligence to protect customers from online threats, such as data stealing malware, phishing attacks, and other web, email, and mobile threats. In 2012, Trend Micro added big data analytics to its Smart Protection Network. Big data analytics allow the network to use behavioral-based identification methods to identify new security threats. The network also combines in-the-cloud technologies with other client-based antivirus technologies to reduce dependency on conventional pattern file downloads on the endpoint. Threat information from Trend Micro's Smart Protection Network is deployed in real time to the company's security software portfolio. Trend Micro's report on EU's General Data Protection Regulation showed an increase in extortion attempts as organizations try to comply with EU privacy laws.

Trend Micro receives its threat intelligence from TrendLabs, the company's research, development, and support center. TrendLabs has ten labs worldwide, and is headquartered in the Philippines and employs 1,200 security experts and engineers. Trend Micro's Singapore-based lab provides malware forensics and analysis.

In February 2018, Trend Micro partnered with Panasonic to build more secure systems for electronic control units in automated cars. In April 2018, the company released a tool that helps identify individual writing styles and combat email fraud.

See also 

 Antivirus software
Cloud security
 Comparison of antivirus software
 Comparison of computer viruses

References

External links
 

1988 establishments in California
Software companies based in Tokyo
Computer security software companies
Computer security companies specializing in botnets
Computer forensics
Computer companies of the United States
Software companies of Japan
Software companies of Taiwan
Software companies established in 1988
Companies formerly listed on the Nasdaq
Companies listed on the Tokyo Stock Exchange
Japanese brands
Taiwanese brands